The FreeX Blade is a German single-place, paraglider that was designed and produced by FreeX of Egling in the mid-2000s. It is now out of production.

Design and development
The Blade was designed as an intermediate high-performance glider. Like all FreeX wings it features internal diagonal bracing. The models are each named for their relative size.

Operational history
The FreeX's CEO flew the Blade and won the German Distance Sport Class competition with it.

Variants
Blade S
Small-sized model for lighter pilots.
Blade M
Mid-sized model for medium-weight pilots. The glider model is DHV 2 certified.
Blade L
Large-sized model for heavier pilots. The glider model is DHV 2 certified.

Specifications (Blade L)

References

Blade
Paragliders